is a public university at Jōetsu, Niigata, Japan. The predecessor of the school was founded in 1977, and it was chartered as a university in 2002.

External links
 Official website

Educational institutions established in 1977
Public universities in Japan
Nursing schools in Japan
Universities and colleges in Niigata Prefecture
1977 establishments in Japan
Jōetsu, Niigata